This is the discography of South Korean singer Kim Tae-woo. Debuting in 1999 as a member of the group g.o.d, he began his solo career in 2006 and has since recorded seven studio albums.

Studio albums

Extended plays

Singles

As lead artist

As featured artist

Other charted songs

As lead artist

As featured artist

Soundtrack appearances

Music videos

References

External links
Discography on Naver Music

Discographies of South Korean artists
Pop music discographies